Medina Mosque or Madina Mosque may refer to:
 Al-Masjid al-Nabawi in Medina, Saudi Arabia
 Madina Mosque (Accra), Ghana
 Madina Mosque (Barbados)
 Madina Mosque (Bengal), in the Nizamat Fort Campus in Murshidabad, West Bengal, India
 Madina Mosque (Preston), England
 Medina Mosque (Sheffield), England